Godland may refer to:
Godland (film), a 2022 drama film directed by Hlynur Pálmason
Godland (comics), a 2010s comic book series

See also 
 Godlands, Australian musician
 Gotland (disambiguation)